The 1991–92 DePaul Blue Demons men's basketball team represented DePaul University as a member of the newly formed Great Midwest Conference during the 1991–92 NCAA Division I men's basketball season. They were led by head coach Joey Meyer, in his 8th season, and played their home games at the Rosemont Horizon in Rosemont.

Roster

Schedule and results

|-
!colspan=9 style=| Regular season

|-
!colspan=12 style=|Great Midwest tournament

|-
!colspan=9 style=| NCAA Tournament

Source:

Rankings

References 

DePaul Blue Demons men's basketball seasons
DePaul
DePaul
DePaul Blue Demons men's basketball
DePaul Blue Demons men's basketball